Lord Smith  may refer to:

Chris Smith, Baron Smith of Finsbury, former Labour cabinet minister, then chair of the Environment Agency
Philip Smith, Baron Smith of Hindhead, British Conservative politician
Robert Smith, Baron Smith of Kelvin, businessman
Rodney Smith, Baron Smith, surgeon
Trevor Arthur Smith, Baron Smith of Clifton, Lib Dem spokesman on Northern Ireland
Peter Smith, Baron Smith of Leigh, Labour councillor from Wigan, chair of Greater Manchester Combined Authority
Robert Dixon-Smith, Baron Dixon-Smith (born 1934), Conservative backbencher

Lady Smith (not to be confused with Ladysmith) may refer to:

Anne Smith, Lady Smith (born 1955), Senator of the College of Justice
Angela Smith, Baroness Smith of Basildon (born 1959), leader of the Labour peers
Elizabeth Smith, Baroness Smith of Gilmorehill (born 1940), widow of John Smith
Julie Smith, Baroness Smith of Newnham (born 1969), Liberal Democrat academic
Margaret Delacourt-Smith, Baroness Delacourt-Smith of Alteryn (1916-2010), Labour backbencher
Ruby McGregor-Smith, Baroness McGregor-Smith (born 1963), business executive
Juana María de los Dolores de León Smith (1798-1872), wife of Sir Harry Smith, 1st Baronet
Lady May Abel Smith (1906-1994), relative of the British royal family
 Lady Smith, a Splicer model in the video games BioShock and BioShock 2